The rusty bush lark (Mirafra rufa), also known as the rusty lark is a species of lark in the family Alaudidae found in the Sahel region of north-central Africa.

Taxonomy and systematics

Subspecies 
Three subspecies are recognized: 
 M. r. nigriticola - Bates, 1932: Found from Mali to Niger
 M. r. rufa - Lynes, 1920: Found in Chad and western Sudan
 M. r. lynesi - Grant, CHB & Mackworth-Praed, 1933: Found in central Sudan

Distribution and habitat
The range of the rusty bush lark is large, with an estimated global extent of occurrence of 470,000 km2. It is typically found inhabiting the dry savannah ecoregions of Chad, Mali, Niger, Sudan, and Togo.

References

rusty bush lark
Birds of the Sahel
rusty bush lark
Taxonomy articles created by Polbot
Taxobox binomials not recognized by IUCN